Ngự Bình is a mountain in the Vietnamese city of Huế. It is also called the "Royal Screen".

History 
The annals "Dai Nam Nhat Thong Chi" by the History Department of the Nguyễn dynasty wrote about Ngu Binh Mountain as follows: "In the northeast of Huong Thuy emerges an even surface serving as a screen, a first bar in front of the citadel. It was called Nui Bang (Even Mount) and renamed Ngu Binh in Gia Long's reign. Its top is flat with pine trees everywhere".

Together with the Perfume River, Ngu Binh Mountain forms a natural ensemble to Huế. For a long time, this mountain and the river have been the symbols of Huế, and people often call Huế, "The land of the Perfume River and Ngu Binh mount" or "Huong-Ngu Land".

For many centuries, many generations of poets and travelers have recognized it a place to admire nature.

Geography 
The 105m high Ngu Binh Mountain has a symmetric figure. On both sides of the Even Mount (Bang Son) are 2 small mounts called Ta Bat Son (Left Mount) and Huu Bat Son (Right Mount). After observing that Bang Son resembled a screen, the Nguyễn emperor decided to build up Huế which became known as their "Forbidden Purple City." Emperor Gia Long approved the design of geomancers which chose this mount as a front altar of the imposing and solid defending wall system, and renamed it Ngu Binh.

On fine days, from the top of Ngu Binh Mount, people can view the city and river, the pine forests on the hills and large plains of Huong Thuy, Phu Vang, Huong Tra Districts with plants and trees. In the distance, the dark purple Truong Son Mountain range lies hidden behind clouds. Towards the east is a dim white sand strip and Thuan An Estuary in the distance along the deep blue Eastern Sea.

Some kilometers away from Ngu Binh Mountain is Vong Canh hill, across from Ngoc Tran Mountain. From the Vong Canh hill, people can behold fruit gardens green with areca (betel nut) palms, longan trees, orange groves (including mandarin variety), grapefruit trees, etc. Mingling with pine trees, grey roofs of pagodas and temples, as well as the ancient and meditative tombs, the Perfume River looks like a soft silk strip winding at the foot of the hill.

References

External links 
 Ngu Binh Mountain information
 Ngu Binh Mountain Fengshui function

Huế
Landforms of Thừa Thiên Huế province
Mountains of Vietnam
Tourist attractions in Thừa Thiên Huế province